James George Abourezk (February 24, 1931February 24, 2023) was an American attorney and politician from South Dakota. A member of the Democratic Party, Abourezk served as a United States senator and United States representative for one term each, and was the first Arab American to serve in the U.S. Senate. He was also the founder of the American-Arab Anti-Discrimination Committee.

He was the first Greek Orthodox Christian of Lebanese-Antiochite descent to serve in the U.S. Senate. He was seen as generally critical of U.S. foreign policy in the Middle-East and North Africa (MENA) area, particularly regarding Palestine and Israel.

Abourezk represented South Dakota in the United States Senate from 1973 until 1979. He was the author of the Indian Child Welfare Act, passed by Congress in 1978 to try to preserve Native American families and tribal culture, by arranging for the placement of Native American children in homes of their cultures, as well as to reunite them with families. It gives preference to tribal courts with custody of Native American children domiciled on reservations and concurrent but presumptive jurisdiction in cases of children outside the reservation.

Early life and education 
James George Abourezk was born in Wood, South Dakota, the son of Lena (née Mickel), a homemaker, and Charles Abourezk, an owner of two general stores. Both of his parents were Lebanese immigrants, and he was one of five children. Growing up on the Rosebud Indian Reservation, he spoke only Arabic at home and did not learn English until he went to elementary school. At the age of 16, he was expelled from school for playing a prank on a teacher, and left home to live with his brother Tom. He completed high school in 1948.

Between 1948 and 1952, Abourezk served in the United States Navy before and during the Korean War. Following 12 weeks of boot camp, he enrolled in Electricians' Mates School, after which he was sent to support Navy ships stationed in Japan.  

Following military service, Abourezk worked on a ranch, in a casino, and as a judo instructor. He earned a degree in civil engineering from the South Dakota School of Mines in Rapid City in 1961, and worked as a civil engineer in California, before returning to South Dakota to work on the Minutemen missile silos. At the age of 32, he decided to pursue law, and earned a J.D. degree from University of South Dakota School of Law in Vermillion in 1966.

Political career 
Abourezk began a legal practice in Rapid City, South Dakota, and joined the Democratic Party. He ran in 1968 for Attorney General of South Dakota but was defeated by Gordon Mydland. In 1970, he was elected to the United States House of Representatives and served from 1971 to 1973, in the state's second Congressional district which was eliminated in 1983.

In 1972, Abourezk was elected to the U.S. Senate, where he served from 1973 to 1979, after which he chose not to seek a second term. He was the first chair of the Senate Committee on Indian Affairs. In 1974, TIME magazine named Senator Abourezk as one of the "200 Faces for the Future".

Legislation 
His legislative successes in the Senate included the 1975 Indian Self-Determination and Education Assistance Act, as well as the American Indian Religious Freedom Act.  

His signature legislation was the Indian Child Welfare Act (ICWA, 1978), designed to protect Native American children and families from being torn apart. Native American children have been removed by state social agencies from their families and placed in foster care or adoption at a disproportionately high rate, and usually placed with non Native American families. This both deprived the children of their culture and threatened the very survival of the tribes. This legislation was intended to provide a federal standard that emphasized the needs of Native American children to be raised in their own cultures, and gave precedence to tribal courts for decisions about children domiciled on the reservation, as well as concurrent but presumptive jurisdiction with state courts for Native American children off the reservation. He also authored and passed the Indian Self-Determination and Education Assistance Act, which provided Indian tribes with greater autonomy. The BIA made grants to the tribes but they could manage contracts and funds to control their own destiny. That legislation also reduced the direct influence of the Bureau of Indian Affairs on the tribes.

As a senator, Abourezk condemned the Office of Public Safety (OPS), a Cold War-era program within the United States Agency for International Development (USAID), which provided training to foreign police forces and was prone to human rights abuses. Abourezk introduced legislation that resulted in the banning of overseas police assistance in 1974, and the closure of the OPS in 1975.

Other initiatives 
After taking office, Abourezk was approached almost daily by representatives of various sides of the conflict in the Middle East. In 1973, Abourezk was invited by the Lebanese embassy to visit Beirut. Later that year, he met with Arab leaders to discuss a possible peace settlement, and attempted to negotiate a truce contingent on Israel's return of the Old City of Jerusalem, the West Bank, and the Gaza Strip, which was rejected by Israel. In 1976, Abourezk voted against the rest of the Senate on a measure to stop foreign aid to countries harboring international terrorists, arguing that there was no provision for terrorist acts committed by the Israeli military.

In 1973, Senators Abourezk and George McGovern attempted to end the occupation of Wounded Knee by negotiating with American Indian Movement leaders, who were in a standoff with federal law enforcement after demanding that the federal government honor its historical treaties with the Oglala Sioux nation. The summer after the occupation, Abourezk introduced the American Indian Policy Review Commission Act, which created the eleven-member commission, and served as its chairman until its landmark report was published in 1977.  He took the gavel as chairman of the Select Committee on Indian Affairs from its creation in 1977 to 1979, when he left the Senate.

Abourezk was an early champion of more direct democracy through a national initiative process, similar to the state initiative process adopted by South Dakota in 1898. In July 1977, he co-sponsored a proposal for a constitutional amendment that would allow federal laws to be enacted through popular vote, together with fellow Senator Mark O. Hatfield (R-OR). Under the Abourezk resolution, voters could put legislation on the national election ballot if they secured signatures from three percent of voters in the previous presidential election. His efforts received national media coverage, and Abourezk chaired hearings and testified that the proposal was based on "belief in the wisdom of the American people". Although the national initiative movement gained additional cosponsors in both the House and Senate in 1978, no further action was taken during the 95th Congress, after which interest waned.

In 1977, Senators Abourezk and McGovern went to Cuba with a group of basketball players from University of South Dakota and South Dakota State who played against the Cuban national men's basketball team. 

In 1978, Abourezk chose not to run for re-election. He was succeeded in office by Republican Larry Pressler, with whom he had a long-running political feud.

Advocacy 

After leaving the Senate, Abourezk served as legal counsel for the Islamic Republic of Iran in Washington, D.C., leading The New York Times to call him "Iran's Man in Washington". He defended the Islamic Republic in lawsuits seeking payment for contracts entered into by the former Shah's government, and sought to recoup Iranian assets that were allegedly taken by Mohammad Reza Pahlavi and his wife.

In 1980, Abourezk founded the American-Arab Anti-Discrimination Committee, a grassroots civil rights organization. In 1989, he published his Advise and Dissent: Memoirs of South Dakota and the U.S. Senate. He was the co-author, along with Hyman Bookbinder, of Through Different Eyes: Two Leading Americans — a Jew and an Arab — Debate U. S. Policy in the Middle East (1987),.

In 2003, Abourezk sued website ProBush.com for defamation. He was later joined by Jane Fonda and Roxanne Dunbar-Ortiz as plaintiffs, and settled the lawsuit with the Internet site in 2005.

In 2007, Abourezk gave an interview to the Hezbollah funded news channel Al-Manar TV. In this interview Abourezk said that he believed that Zionists used the terrorists that perpetrated the 9/11 terrorist attacks as a way to sow Islamophobia, that Zionists control the United States Congress, and that Hezbollah and Hamas are resistance fighters.

After his retirement from the Senate, Abourezk worked as a lawyer and writer in Sioux Falls, South Dakota. He continued to be active in supporting tribal sovereignty and culture. In July 2015 he spoke out against a suit filed against the ICWA by the Goldwater Institute; it was one of three suits seeking to overturn the act. Some states and adoption groups, who make money off adoptions, have opposed any prohibitions on their placements of Native American children. Abourezk considered this his signature legislation and the new rules instrumental in protecting Native American children and preserving tribal families. He noted that the late Senator Barry Goldwater, his friend and colleague, had voted for the legislation in 1977 and had often consulted with him in tribal matters.

Huffington Post writer James Zogby in 2014 praised Abourezk as a "bold and courageous former Senator" for protesting to the FBI after the ABSCAM operation.

Personal life and death 
Abourezk was married three times. His first marriage was to Mary Ann Houlton in 1952, which ended in divorce in 1981. They had three children. He subsequently married and divorced Margaret Bethea, before marrying Sanaa Dieb in 1991, with the couple remaining together until his death.

Abourezk lived in South Dakota for most of his life. He died at home in Sioux Falls on February 24, 2023, his 92nd birthday.

See also
List of Arab and Middle Eastern Americans in the United States Congress

References

External links

 American-Arab Anti Discrimination Committee official website
 

|-

|-

|-

1931 births
2023 deaths
20th-century American lawyers
20th-century American politicians
American politicians of Lebanese descent
Democratic Party members of the United States House of Representatives from South Dakota
Democratic Party United States senators from South Dakota
Direct democracy activists
Greek Orthodox Christians from the United States
Members of the United States House of Representatives from South Dakota
Middle Eastern Christians
Military personnel from South Dakota
People from Mellette County, South Dakota
Politicians from Rapid City, South Dakota
Politicians from Sioux Falls, South Dakota
South Dakota lawyers
South Dakota School of Mines and Technology alumni
University of South Dakota School of Law alumni
Writers from Sioux Falls, South Dakota